Don Solaris is a 1996 studio album by the British electronic music group 808 State, and their fifth studio album overall. In October 2008, the album was reissued on ZTT Records and an additional bonus disc of unreleased and remixed tracks.

Track listing
 "Intro" – 1:16
 "Bond"  – 5:09
 "Bird" – 3:53
 "Azura"  – 5:30
 "Black Dartagnon" – 5:30
 "Joyrider" – 4:40
 "Lopez"  – 4:17
 "Balboa" – 5:14
 "Kohoutek" – 4:46
 "Mooz"  – 4:35
 "Jerusahat" – 5:12
 "Banacheq" – 5:39
 "Bonded" – 5:50*
 "Chisler" – 5:50*
 * – Appear on Japanese release only.

Deluxe edition disc 2
 "Spanish Marching" (Fonphone Mix) – 5:58
 "Joyrider" (A Natural Mix) – 7:01
 "Baton Rouge" (Cajun Mix) – 5:48
 "Lopez" (Instrumental) – 4:25
 "Mondays" (Part One) – 4:56
 "Relay" (Wool Hall Mix One) – 2:54
 "Goa" – 4:09
 "Bonded" – 5:51
 "Paradan" – 5:03
 "The Chisler" – 5:49
 "Lopez" (Brian Eno Mix) – 6:25
 "Joyrider" (Sure Is Pure Remix) – 11:02

References 

1996 albums
808 State albums
Tommy Boy Records albums
ZTT Records albums